Little Holm is a common island name in Shetland and Orkney. It is a tautology, as "holm" already means a small island.

 Little Holm, Dunrossness
 Little Holm, Yell Sound